The Pony Express Bridge is a highway girder bridge over the Missouri River connecting Elwood, Kansas with St. Joseph, Missouri on U.S. Route 36 (US 36).

The bridge is referred to in signage as Pony Express Bridges because there are separate bridges for east and west bound traffic. The bridges were built in 1983 to replace a truss bridge built in 1929. The truss bridge was demolished in March 1984.

The bridge is near the Pony Express stables at its eastern terminus in St. Joseph. US 36 to Marysville, Kansas is designated the Pony Express Memorial Highway because it follows the route. The bridge also passes over the family property of Johnny Fry, the "official" first west-bound rider of the Pony Express.

See also
List of crossings of the Missouri River

References

Buildings and structures in St. Joseph, Missouri
Buildings and structures in Doniphan County, Kansas
Bridges completed in 1983
Bridges over the Missouri River
U.S. Route 36
Road bridges in Missouri
Road bridges in Kansas
Bridges of the United States Numbered Highway System
Girder bridges in the United States
Interstate vehicle bridges in the United States